List of companies traded on the Bolsa Mexicana de Valores (Mexican Stock Exchange) sorted by revenues and classified according to GICS.

List

See also

List of companies of Mexico 
 Economy of Mexico  
 Mexican Stock Exchange
 Indice de Precios y Cotizaciones (México)
 Small and medium enterprises in Mexico

References

External links